Gaumont Animation (formerly known as Alphanim) is a French animation studio. It was acquired by Gaumont Film Company in 2008 as a return to television production, and an entry into English-language productions, after Gaumont Television was sold in 1999. It was rebranded as Gaumont Animation in 2013. The company's animated catalog comprises over 800 half-hours, broadcast in over 130 countries.

Its productions include Mona the Vampire, Robotboy, Galactik Football, Calimero, Noddy, Toyland Detective (after the rights were acquired from DreamWorks Animation in 2013), Trulli Tales, Belle and Sebastian, Furiki Wheels, F is for Family and Samurai Rabbit: The Usagi Chronicles. Film projects in development include Plunder and a musical adaptation of Paul McCartney's novel High in the Clouds.

Productions

Series

Films

References

External links
Gaumont-Alphanim at Internet Movie Database
 Gaumont Animation at Internet Movie Database

Gaumont Animation
French animation studios
Gaumont Film Company
French companies established in 1997
Entertainment companies established in 1997
Mass media companies established in 1997